The 1981 Avon Championships of Los Angeles was a women's tennis tournament played on indoor carpet courts at the Forum in Los Angeles, California in the United States that was part of the 1981 Avon Championships circuit. It was the eighth edition of the tournament and was held from March 2 through March 8, 1981. Second-seeded Martina Navratilova won the singles title, her second consecutive and third in total at the event, and earned $30,000 first-prize money.

Finals

Singles
 Martina Navratilova defeated  Andrea Jaeger 6–4, 6–0
 It was Navratilova's 3rd singles title of the year and the 48th of her career.

Doubles
 Sue Barker /  Ann Kiyomura defeated  Marita Redondo /  Peanut Louie 6–1, 4–6, 6–1

Prize money

References

External links
 International Tennis Federation (ITF) tournament edition details

Avon Championships of Los Angeles
LA Women's Tennis Championships
Avon Championships of Los Angeles
Avon Championships of Los Angeles
Avon Championships of Los Angeles
Avon Championships of Los Angeles